Västgöta Wing, also F 6 Karlsborg, or simply F 6, is a former Swedish Air Force wing with the main base located near Karlsborg in south-central Sweden.

History
The airfield Lusharpan had been used by the army air corps of Karlsborg Fortress since 1915 to practice strafing and bombing at the artillery range. In 1936, the first steps was taken towards a permanent base by constructing hangars for two squadrons. In 1937 the grass field was extended to 1600 m x 1200 m and a maintenance shop was also put up.

The Air Wing was officially commissioned on July 1, 1939 but with only 19 staff and three officers with one Sk 9, one Sk 11 trainers and three other aircraft on loan from other wings.

With World War II breaking out on September 1, 1939, Jämtland Wing (F 4) regrouped their B 4 bombers to Karlsborg and transferred them to the F 6 wing at the same rate as the F 4 wing received their new B 5 bombers. The B 4 bombers were kept until 1941 when they were transferred to Skaraborg Wing (F 7) in favor of new B 5 bombers.

Between 1943 and 1947 the wing was equipped with B 17 dive bombers.

In 1947, the wing was redesigned as an attack wing and replaced the B 17s with A 21 aircraft, even though the tactical use of the new aircraft was the same as with the B 17s. Some of the A 21s were transferred from Skaraborg Wing. There were a total of 70 A 21s at F 6, but a staggering 30 planes were lost due to the poor condition of the grass field which was paved in 1950.

The Saab 29 Tunnan was briefly in service for four years from 1954 to 1957 until the Saab 32 Lansen was introduced and served for 20 years until 1977. The jet noise of the Saab 32 Lansen was so high that the base was forced to buy the property of complaining residents.

In 1977 the AJ 37 replaced the A 32 and was in service until the base was decommissioned on June 30, 1994.

The airfield was reopened in 2007 under the control of Life Regiment Hussars (K 3).

Barracks and training areas

Barracks
Among other things, the wing took over the premises of the Infantry Volunteer School (Infanterivolontärskolan) in Karlsborg. The runway, which runs in a north-south direction, was built in 1936-39 and extended in 1956. New hangars were built in 1961 and 1979.

Training areas
Rissnäset and Perstorp north of Karlsborg.

Heraldry and traditions

Coat of arms
The coat of arms of the Västgöta Wing was used from 1939 to 1994. Blazon: "The provincial badge of Västergötland, per bend sinister sable and or, a lion rampant counterchanged, armed and langued gules between two estoiles argent in the first field".

Colours, standards and guidons
The colour was presented to the wing on 5 December 1940 by His Royal Highness Prince Gustaf Adolf, Duke of Västerbotten. Blazon: "On blue cloth in the centre the badge of the Air Force; a winged two-bladed propeller under a royal crown proper, all yellow. In the first corner the lion of the provincial badge of Västergötland; bended sinister in yellow and white, armed and langued red, between two white estoiles".

March
”Victoria-marsch” was composed in the 1890s by the civil engineer Gustaf (Gösta) Korsgren. It was adopted on 4 April 1986. The march is also adopted as march of the Voluntary Officer Training (Frivilliga Befälsutbildningen, FBU) in 1977.

Commanding officers
Commanding officers from 1939 to 1994. The commanding officer was referred to as wing commander and had the rank of colonel.

1939–1941: John Stenbeck
1941–1950: Gösta Hård
1950–1960: Anders ("Ante") Söderlindh
1960–1971: Nils Hansson
1971–1977: Hans Sjövall
1977–1986: Gunnar Hovgard
1986–1989: Göran Tode
1989–1993: Sten Öhlander
1993–1994: Claes Bjärle (acting)

Names, designations and locations

See also
 Swedish Air Force
 List of military aircraft of Sweden

Footnotes

References

Notes

Print

Web

Further reading

Wings of the Swedish Air Force
Military units and formations established in 1939
Military units and formations disestablished in 1994
1939 establishments in Sweden
1994 disestablishments in Sweden
Karlsborg Garrison
Disbanded units and formations of Sweden